Events in the year 1906 in Costa Rica.

Incumbents
President: Ascensión Esquivel Ibarra until May 8, Cleto González Víquez

Events

Births
September 25 - José Figueres Ferrer, President 1948-1949, 1953-1958, 1970-1974 (d. 1990)

Deaths

References

 
1900s in Costa Rica